In statistical mechanics, a microstate is a specific microscopic configuration of a thermodynamic system that the system may occupy with a certain probability in the course of its thermal fluctuations. In contrast, the macrostate of a system refers to its macroscopic properties, such as its temperature, pressure, volume and density.  Treatments on statistical mechanics define a macrostate as follows: a particular set of values of energy, the number of particles, and the volume of an isolated thermodynamic system is said to specify a particular macrostate of it.  In this description, microstates appear as different possible ways the system can achieve a particular macrostate.

A macrostate is characterized by a probability distribution of possible states across a certain statistical ensemble of all microstates. This distribution describes the probability of finding the system in a certain microstate. In the thermodynamic limit, the microstates visited by a macroscopic system during its fluctuations all have the same macroscopic properties.

Microscopic definitions of thermodynamic concepts
Statistical mechanics links the empirical thermodynamic properties of a system to the statistical distribution of an ensemble of microstates. All macroscopic thermodynamic properties of a system may be calculated from the partition function that sums  of all its microstates.

Internal energy
The internal energy of the macrostate is the mean over all microstates of the system's energy

This is a microscopic statement of the notion of energy associated with the first law of thermodynamics.

Entropy
For the more general case of the canonical ensemble, the absolute entropy depends exclusively on the probabilities of the microstates and is defined as

where  is the Boltzmann constant. For the microcanonical ensemble, consisting of only those microstates with energy equal to the energy of the macrostate, this simplifies to
 
with the number of microstates . This form for entropy appears on Ludwig Boltzmann's gravestone in Vienna.

The second law of thermodynamics describes how the entropy of an isolated system changes in time. The third law of thermodynamics is consistent with this definition, since zero entropy means that the macrostate of the system reduces to a single microstate.

Heat and work
Heat and work can be distinguished if we take the underlying quantum nature of the system into account.

For a closed system (no transfer of matter), heat in statistical mechanics is the energy transfer associated with a disordered, microscopic action on the system, associated with jumps in occupation numbers of the quantum energy levels of the system, without change in the values of the energy levels themselves.

Work is the energy transfer associated with an ordered, macroscopic action on the system. If this action acts very slowly, then the adiabatic theorem of quantum mechanics implies that this will not cause jumps between energy levels of the system. In this case, the internal energy of the system only changes due to a change of the system's energy levels.

The microscopic, quantum definitions of heat and work are the following:

so that

The two above definitions of heat and work are among the few expressions of statistical mechanics where the thermodynamic quantities defined in the quantum case find no analogous definition in the classical limit. The reason is that classical microstates are not defined in relation to a precise associated quantum microstate, which means that when work changes the total energy available for distribution among the classical microstates of the system, the energy levels (so to speak) of the microstates do not follow this change.

The microstate in phase space

Classical phase space 
The description of a classical system of F degrees of freedom may be stated in terms of a 2F dimensional phase space, whose coordinate axes consist of the F generalized coordinates qi of the system, and its F generalized momenta pi. The microstate of such a system will be specified by a single point in the phase space. But for a system with a huge number of degrees of freedom its exact microstate usually is not important. So the phase space can be divided into cells of the size h0 = ΔqiΔpi, each treated as a microstate.

The number of microstates Ω that a closed system can occupy is proportional to its phase space volume:  where  is an Indicator function. It is 1 if the Hamilton function H(x) at the point x = (q,p) in phase space is between U and U+ δU and 0 if not. The constant  makes Ω(U) dimensionless.

In this description, the particles are distinguishable. If the position and momentum of two particles are exchanged, the new state will be represented by a different point in phase space. In this case a single point will represent a microstate. If a subset of M particles are indistinguishable from each other, then the M! possible permutations or possible exchanges of these particles will be counted as part of a single microstate. The set of possible microstates are also reflected in the constraints upon the thermodynamic system.

For example, in the case of a simple gas of N particles with total energy U contained in a cube of volume V, in which a sample of the gas cannot be distinguished from any other sample by experimental means, a microstate will consist of the above-mentioned N! points in phase space, and the set of microstates will be constrained to have all position coordinates to lie inside the box, and the momenta to lie on a hyperspherical surface in momentum coordinates of radius U. If on the other hand, the system consists of a mixture of two different gases,  samples of which can be distinguished from each other, say A and B, then the number of microstates is increased, since two points in which an A and B particle are exchanged in phase space are no longer part of the same microstate. Two particles that are identical may nevertheless be distinguishable based on, for example, their location. (See configurational entropy.) If the box contains identical particles, and is at equilibrium, and a partition is inserted, dividing the volume in half, particles in one box are now distinguishable from those in the second box. In phase space, the N/2 particles in each box are now restricted to a volume V/2, and their energy restricted to U/2, and the number of points describing a single microstate will change: the phase space description is not the same.

This has implications in both the Gibbs paradox and correct Boltzmann counting. With regard to Boltzmann counting, it is the multiplicity of points in phase space which effectively reduces the number of microstates and renders the entropy extensive. With regard to Gibbs paradox, the important result is that the increase in the number of microstates (and thus the increase in entropy) resulting from the insertion of the partition is exactly matched by the decrease in the number of microstates (and thus the decrease in entropy) resulting from the reduction in volume available to each particle, yielding a net entropy change of zero.

See also
 Quantum statistical mechanics
 Degrees of freedom (physics and chemistry)
 Ergodic hypothesis
 Phase space

References

External links
 Some illustrations of microstates vs. macrostates

Statistical mechanics